Robert Gray, also known as Bobby Gray (18 June 1927 – 25 October 2018) was a Scottish professional footballer who played for Wishaw Juniors and Lincoln City as a winger.

References

1927 births
2018 deaths
Scottish footballers
Wishaw Juniors F.C. players
Lincoln City F.C. players
English Football League players
Association football wingers